Take Shelter is a 2011 American psychological thriller film, written and directed by Jeff Nichols and starring Michael Shannon and Jessica Chastain. The plot follows a young husband and father (Shannon) who is plagued by a series of apocalyptic visions, and questions whether to shelter his family from a coming storm, or from himself and his increasing worries over having paranoid schizophrenia. 

The film won two Saturn Awards, Best Writing for Nichols and Best Actor for Shannon, and was nominated for two more, Best Horror or Thriller Film and Best Actress for Chastain. It explores the themes of masculinity, mental illness, and the lengths people go to protect the ones they love.

Plot
In LaGrange, Ohio, Curtis LaForche has apocalyptic dreams and visual and auditory hallucinations of rain "like fresh motor oil", swarms of menacing black birds, and being harmed by people close to him. He hides all of this from his wife, Samantha, and their deaf daughter, Hannah.  He instead channels his anxieties into a compulsive obsession to improve and enlarge a storm shelter in his backyard; however, his increasingly strange behavior – including a tendency to cut ties with anyone in his life that has harmed him only in his dreams – strains his relationship with his family, friends, employer, and the close-knit town. He also puts his construction job in jeopardy as he borrows equipment from the company to build his shelter.

To deal with his increased insomnia and apocalyptic visions, Curtis grudgingly sees a counselor at a free clinic, with whom he talks about his family's psychological history.  His mother, Sarah, has paranoid schizophrenia that surfaced in her at about the same age that Curtis is now. He's worried that he may also have the disorder.

In order to get the remodeled storm shelter completed, Curtis gets a home improvement loan he can't afford to start building the shelter – all without telling his wife.  Samantha becomes angry when she discovers the project. After Curtis takes more than the prescribed dose of a sedative and has a seizure, Samantha calls an ambulance.  He recovers, then finally explains the truth to her, including his dreams.

Curtis increasing absence from work, causing tension with his boss, as he and Samantha make preparations for the cochlear implant surgery Hannah in six weeks' time.  Having been informed of the borrowed work equipment, Curtis's boss fires him and gives him only two weeks' worth of medical insurance benefits, after placing Dewart, the close friend and co-worker whom Curtis asked to help him start construction of the shelter, on two weeks' unpaid administrative leave.

Curtis buys gas masks for his family and extends his previous employer's health insurance policy for a few extra weeks.  After he finds out that his counselor at the free clinic has suddenly transferred and been replaced with a new one, he walks out.  Tensions linger between Curtis and Sam over his loss of a job/income at such a crucial time for their family.  Samantha gets Curtis to see an actual psychiatrist and demands that they attend a social function so she can restore some sense of normalcy to their strained, increasingly isolated life. At a Lions Club community gathering, a bitter Dewart, who has been spreading gossip that Curtis is crazy, is angrily provoked and punches him.  Enraged, Curtis knocks Dewart to the floor, overturns a table and unleashes a frightening verbal tirade upon everyone present.  He prophetically shouts that a devastating storm is coming, insisting that none of them are prepared.

Later, a tornado warning sends him and his family into the shelter.  After they awaken, Curtis reluctantly removes his gas mask, prompted by Samantha.  They go to open the shelter doors, but he still hears a storm outside. His wife implores him, insisting that there's no storm and that he needs to open the door. After a tense standoff, Curtis throws open the doors into the blinding sun; a strong-but-bearable storm has passed, and neighbors are cleaning up broken tree limbs and other yard debris as power company trucks restore electricity along the street.

A psychiatrist advises the couple to go through with their planned, annual beach vacation, but that Curtis will need to get psychiatric care in a facility away from his family upon their return.  At Myrtle Beach, while Curtis is building sand castles with Hannah, she signs the word "storm".  As Samantha exits their beachhouse, the thick, oily rain that Curtis spoke of begins to fall, staining her outstretched hand.  Samantha looks up to a bigger version of the ominous storm clouds Curtis had seen, massing over the ocean; tornado-like waterspouts reach down to the ocean's surface, and the tide pulls back as a tsunami looms in the distance. Samantha and Curtis exchange glances, as Samantha assuringly whispers "okay." The scene cuts to black, leaving the truth of the reality a mystery.

Cast

Release
Take Shelter premiered in January 2011 at the Sundance Film Festival, and Sony Pictures Classics acquired rights to distribute the film in North America, Latin America, Australia, and New Zealand. The film also screened in May 2011 at the Cannes Film Festival, where it won the 50th Critics' Week Grand Prix. It also received the Fipresci award from the International Federation of Film Critics, sharing it with Le Havre and The Minister. In September 2011, Take Shelter was shown at the 37th Deauville American Film Festival, where it beat 13 other contenders to win the festival's grand prize. Later in September, Take Shelter was shown at the 2011 Toronto International Film Festival and at the 7th Zurich Film Festival, where it was awarded as the best International Feature Film.

Reception

Critical response
Take Shelter received critical acclaim. It has a rating of 92% on Rotten Tomatoes, based on 168 reviews, with an average score of 8/10. The consensus states "Michael Shannon gives a powerhouse performance and the purposefully subtle filmmaking creates a perfect blend of drama, terror, and dread." The film also has a score of 85 out of 100 on Metacritic, based on 34 reviews, indicating "universal acclaim".

Roger Ebert of the Chicago Sun-Times gave the film four out of four stars and praised Shannon's performance, writing, "It is the gift of actor Michael Shannon as Curtis LaForche that while appearing to be a stable husband and father with a good job in construction, he also can evoke by his eyes and manner a deep unease." He also wrote, "Here is a frightening thriller based not on special effects gimmicks but on a dread that seems quietly spreading in the land: that the good days are ending, and climate changes or other sinister forces will sweep away our safety."

Ending
Since the release of Take Shelter, viewers have discussed the meaning of the film's ambiguous ending. In an interview with Creative Screenwriting five years after the release of the film, Nichols reflected, "I had a very strict idea of what the end of Take Shelter was. I know exactly what happens, and it’s fascinating to see people respond to it in their own ways. The beautiful part of storytelling is that you’re not just telling people a story, they’re also telling you something about themselves too through their reactions. In that situation you’re in a conversation with your audience. I really can’t think of a more rewarding or fulfilling result for something you’ve written. It’s active, kinetic, and really humbling."

In a video interview with Chase Whale in September 2012, Nichols elaborated on the ending, saying "For me personally...the moment that matters, dream, not dream, real, not real, whatever it is...is these two characters looking at each other and connecting.  The fact that they're both seeing it, that's what matters, because if this is a film that is a meditation on marriage and commitment and communication then what the ending has to be is that these people are on the same page again.  They had this wedge put in between them from all of these various factors, and now at the end they're looking at each other, and they are seeing each other, and they're together, and the circumstances that surround that, please, open to interpretation."

See also

List of films featuring the deaf and hard of hearing

References

External links
 
 
 
 
 
 

2011 films
2011 drama films
2011 independent films
2010s psychological drama films
American drama films
American independent films
Apocalyptic films
2010s English-language films
Films about psychiatry
Films directed by Jeff Nichols
Films set in Ohio
Films shot in Ohio
Sony Pictures Classics films
2010s American films
Films set in bunkers